Inayat Hussain is the name of:

 Inayat Hussain Bhatti (1928–1999), Pakistani film playback singer, actor, producer, director, scriptwriter
 Inayat Hussain Khan (1849–1919), Indian classical vocalist
 Master Inayat Hussain (1916–1993), Pakistani film music composer